{{Speciesbox
|image=Rhododendron anthopogon subsp. hypenanthum 'Annapurna'.JPG
|image_caption=Rhododendron anthopogon subsp. hypenanthum 'Annapurna' cultivar
|genus=Rhododendron
|species=anthopogon
|authority=D.Don
|synonyms_ref=
|synonyms=
Rhododendron anthopogon var. album Davidian
Rhododendron anthopogon var. hypenanthum (Balf.f.) H.HaraRhododendron aromaticum Wall.Rhododendron haemonium Balf.f. & R.E.Cooper
}}Rhododendron anthopogon, the dwarf rhododendron, is a species of flowering plant in the family Ericaceae, native to Pakistan, the Himalayas, Tibet, and Myanmar. It is used to make an essential oil. Its habitats include open slopes, thickets, hillsides, and cliff ledges.

Subtaxa
The following subspecies are accepted:Rhododendron anthopogon subsp. anthopogon – Himalayas, Tibet, MyanmarRhododendron anthopogon subsp. hypenanthum'' (Balf.f.) Cullen – Pakistan, Himalayas, Tibet

References

anthopogon
Flora of Pakistan
Flora of West Himalaya
Flora of Nepal
Flora of East Himalaya
Flora of Tibet
Flora of Myanmar
Plants described in 1821